Sinyang may refer to:
 Sinyang County, a county of South Pyongan Province in North Korea
 Xinyang or Sinyang, a city of Henan Province in China
 Sinyang-myeon, a township of Yesan County in South Chungcheong Province, South Korea and birthplace of Pak Hon-yong